The 26th San Diego Film Critics Society Awards were announced on January 10, 2022. The nominations were announced on January 7, 2022, with Belfast leading the nominations with twelve, followed by Dune with nine and The Power of the Dog with eight.

Dune and The Power of the Dog won the most awards with three wins each, with the latter winning Best Picture.

Winners and nominees

Winners are listed at the top of each list in bold, while the runner-ups and nominees for each category are listed under them.

References

External links
 Official Site

2021 film awards
2021 in American cinema
2021